Tarhuna, also Tarhoona or Tarhunah, is a Libyan town  to the southeast of Tripoli, in the Murqub District. The city derives its name from that of its pre-Roman-era inhabitants, a Berber tribe. The city was known as al-Boirat during the 19th through mid 20th century but assumed its current name after Libyan independence. The Tarhuna District, including the city of Msallata, had an urban population of about 296,000 (est. 2003). The population in Tarhuna proper was calculated to be 13,264 in 2011.

Geographical boundaries: from the "Valley of the famm Molgha" west to "Burkaat Oueny" eastward. Then from the "Suq al Juma (Al-msab`ha)" north, " Al-mzawgha and Marghna" south.

History
In the city centre of Tarhuna, just opposite the Tarhuna mosque, there is a memorial to Ali Swidan Alhatmy, who was a hero in the 18 June 1915 Battle of El-Shqiga against the Italians. He was captured in 1922 and hanged by the Italians in the town square.

The population generally belongs to the Tarhuna tribe, which was favoured during the regime of Muammar Gaddafi. In late August 2011 (as part of the Libyan Civil War), opposition forces from the National Liberation Amy entered Tarhuna, amidst mixed feelings from the citizens.

On 23 August 2012, Interior ministry spokesman Abdelmonem al-Hur stated that more than a hundred tanks and twenty-six rocket launchers were seized from an alleged pro-Gaddafi militia (named Katibat Al-Awfiyah, or Brigade of the Faithful), during a raid on their campsite in Tarhuna. The operation ended with one of the suspects killed, eight wounded and thirteen detainees, accused of being linked with the 19 August Tripoli bombings.

According to reports in The Washington Post, Tarhuna was dominated between 2011 and 2020 by the Kani brothers and their militia, the Kaniyat. Imposing a reign of terror, the Kaniyat were allegedly responsible for hundreds of killings in the town, with the collusion of the Government of National Accord. In 2019, the Kaniyat switched allegiance to the warlord Khalifa Haftar-led LNA forces during the Second Libyan Civil War, and became the LNA's stronghold in western Libya. On 18 April 2020, the forces of the UN-recognized GNA government, with the backing of Turkish drones, launched a major offensive with the aim to reclaim Tarhuna from Haftar. On 5 June, it was captured by the GNA. Explosive devices, landmines, and mass graves of civilians, many buried alive, were discovered in the city.

Economy
Tarhuna is a leading producer of olive oil, cereals, figs, grapes, sparto grass, and various nuts.

Education
The Faculty of Law of Al Nasser University is located north of town.

Notable people of Tarhuna

 Ahmed Al-Mraied. Commander – tribes Tarhunah – during the period of resistance against the Italian colonization in Tarhunah – a four bosses for – Republic of Tripoli – was chosen to be heads the Shura Council of the Republic of Tripoli – as it was named chairman of the Reform Party National 30 September 1919 – was elected president of the Conference of Gharyan 1920 and the presidency of the Commission reform central
 Al-Mabrouk Al-Montaser. Born in the Suq Al-Ahad in Tarhunah – was commander of the fighters in the western region of Tarhunah against Italian forces – in battles (Shara`a Ash Shat – Ain Zara – Beyr Terffas). Emigrated to Egypt after the end of the resistance in Libya
 Giovanni Innocenzo Martinelli (1942–2019), Libyan-Italian Roman Catholic prelate
 Ali Al-Abany. Born in Al-Ghomen Village Tarhuna 1946 – Painter – studied painting in Italy and graduated excellent grade – founding member (Club Painters) in Tripoli in 1960 – won an award – the Golden Sail – of the State of Kuwait in 1975.
 Mohammed Az Zwawey. Highlighted Caricaturist in Libya – Born in the suburbs of Benghazi in 1936, died on Sunday, 5 June 2011
 Ahmed Mukhtar Al-Tarhuni. Photographer winning several awards locally and internationally and the Arab world
 Suleiman Altarhuni. Lyricist – wrote lyrics known in Libya, including (weenak weenak) artist Mohamed Hassan

Sport

Founded in Tarhunah many sports clubs: Al-Noor School club ( teachers club ) - Al-Amal Club was founded in 1960 - the hero of the Football League in the central region - currently playing in the third division Al-Shabeba Club Club Soqor Al-Sag`ya

See also
 List of cities in Libya
 Tarhuna District
 Tarhuna Wa Msalata District

Notes

External links
 "Tarhuna, Libya" Falling Rain Genomics, Inc.
 "Photo gallery of al_allagi"
 "Photo gallery of al_Maradi"

Populated places in Murqub District
Tripolitania
Baladiyat of Libya